Gorton South is a defunct Local Government ward in the Gorton area of the City of Manchester. The population of Gorton South ward at the 2011 census was 19,615. Under boundary changes by the Local Government Boundary Commission for England (LGBCE) the ward was abolished and replaced with the new electoral ward Gorton and Abbey Hey from May 2018.

Governance 

Gorton South is in the parliamentary constituency of Manchester Gorton. It has been represented in Westminster by Afzal Khan since June 2017. The city councillors for the ward are Julie Reid (Labour), Peter Cookson (Labour) and Bernard Stone (Labour).

The area was previously represented by James Ashley who was Lord Mayor of Manchester at the time of his death in 2006.

Councillors
Julie Reid (Lab), Peter Cookson (Lab), and Bernard Stone (Lab)

 indicates seat up for re-election.
 indicates seat won in by-election.
 indicates ward abolished and replaced with new ward: Gorton and Abbey Hey.

Geography
Gorton South is bounded by the neighbourhoods of Gorton North to the north, Longsight to the east, Levenshulme to the south and Denton West and Reddish North to the west.

References

External links
 Office for National Statistics

Manchester City Council Wards